Iglunga (previously: Iglungayut) was an Inuit settlement, now uninhabited, in the Qikiqtaaluk Region, Nunavut, Canada.

Information
It is located on a Baffin Island offshore island, just south of Iglunga Island, at the southern entrance into Bon Accord Harbour, southwest of Auyuittuq National Park Reserve. The nearest community is Pangnirtung. The name change from Iglungayut to Iglunga occurred 1 August 1957.

References

Baffin Island
Ghost towns in Nunavut
History of Nunavut
Inuit history
Former populated places in the Qikiqtaaluk Region